Dictyosphaeriaceae is a family of green algae. , AlgaeBase places two genera in the family:
Dactylosphaerium Steinecke
Dimorphococcopsis C.-C.Jao
However, AlgaeBase does not include the type genus Dictyosphaeria in the family.

Members of the family can reproduce either asexually by use of an autospore, or sexually by fertilization of an egg by sperm. They form colonies which have a gelatinous coating. The four (or more?) daughter cells connect via  filaments derived from the cell wall of the mother cell. The cell body is elliptical, spherical, or heart shaped. It has a single chloroplast which is plate-like or cup-shaped and contains a pyrenoid.

References

Trebouxiophyceae
Chlorophyceae families